Ulrich Kaufmann ( – ) was a Swiss mountain guide. He was born and died in Grindelwald.

He was among the first Westerners to visit the mountain ranges of New Zealand and the Himalayas.

Biography 
In August 1857, Kaufmann participated in the first ascent of the Mönch. In July 1856, the Viennese physician Sigmund Porges had climbed the Jungfrau with the Grindelwald guide Christian Almer. The next year he came back to attempt a first ascent of the notorious Eiger. Christian Almer was Ulrich Kaufmann's brother in law, possibly explaining how Porges included the 17-year old Kaufmann as one of his guides, along with Almer and Christian Kaufmann Sr. They took off on August 13, but conditions were poor. The attempt on Eiger faltered the next day, and the party turned its attention to the neighboring Mönch. They had another bivouac an hour below the Mönchjoch (pass) and finally summited Mönch at 3 pm on August 15, after Kaufmann and his fellow guides had cut 300 steps in ice. The next year, Porges performed the second ascent of Eiger with different guides. 

In 1882, Kaufmann undertook the first attempted ascent of Aoraki / Mount Cook with William Spotswood Green (an Irish priest, marine biologist and member of the Alpine Club), and Swiss alpinist and hotelier Emil Boss. On 2 March 1882, they failed just  short of the summit because of a storm. The first complete ascent of Aoraki would not take place until nearly 13 years later.

In 1883, he and Emil Boss took part in the first climbing expedition in the Himalayas, led by William Woodman Graham. Among others, they claimed a near ascent of Dunagiri (reaching about 6,900 m) and an ascent of Changabang (6,864 m, 22,520 ft) in July in the Garhwal Himalaya. These claims are widely disputed and were probably based on poor maps and a misunderstanding of their location. Kaufmann, Boss and Graham therefore likely broke the world altitude record in mountaineering by 350 m or 550 m and held this record for 26 years, until the Duke of the Abruzzi's expedition to the Karakoram in 1909 reached an altitude of ca. .

Other first ascents 
 1861 – First ascent of the Schreckhorn with Peter Michel, Leslie Stephen and Christian Michel, by the south face, on 16 August
 1862 – First ascent of the Grosses Fiescherhorn with Adolphus Warburton Moore, H. B. George and Christian Almer, on 23 July

References

Sources 
 
 
 

1840 births
1917 deaths
Alpine guides
People from Grindelwald
Swiss mountain climbers